Zoltán Béres (born January 19, 1968 in Nyírbátor) is a boxer from Hungary, who won a light heavyweight bronze medal at the 1992 Summer Olympics.

Amateur career
As an amateur, Beres was a member of the Hungarian Olympic team of 1992 Barcelona in light heavyweight and won the light heavyweight bronze medal.

Amateur highlights
1992 Olympic results: boxed as a light heavyweight (81 kg)
Round of 32 - Defeated Paolo Mwaselle of Tanzania, 30:13
Round of 16 - Defeated Asghar Ali Changezi of Pakistan, RSCH-1
Quarterfinals - Defeated Roland Raforme of Seychelles, 11:3
Semifinals - Lost to Rostislav Zaulichniy of Unified Team URS, RSC-3

Professional career
Beres began his professional career in 1998 and has had limited success.  Having fought mainly in Europe, he has lost to the likes of Tomasz Adamek, Silvio Branco, and Sebastian Kober.

Professional boxing record

|-
|align="center" colspan=8|44 wins (17 knockouts, 27 decisions), 52 losses (27 knockouts, 25 decisions), 3 draws
|-
| align="center" style="border-style: none none solid solid; background: #e3e3e3"|Result
| align="center" style="border-style: none none solid solid; background: #e3e3e3"|Record
| align="center" style="border-style: none none solid solid; background: #e3e3e3"|Opponent
| align="center" style="border-style: none none solid solid; background: #e3e3e3"|Type
| align="center" style="border-style: none none solid solid; background: #e3e3e3"|Round
| align="center" style="border-style: none none solid solid; background: #e3e3e3"|Date
| align="center" style="border-style: none none solid solid; background: #e3e3e3"|Location
| align="center" style="border-style: none none solid solid; background: #e3e3e3"|Notes
|-
|Loss
|
|align=left| Mohamed Al Zein
|KO
|1
|11/10/2015
|align=left| Herne, Germany
|align=left|
|-
|Loss
|
|align=left| Dennis Lewandowski
|PTS
|4
|08/11/2014
|align=left| Koblenz, Germany
|
|-
|Loss
|
|align=left| Tamas Kovacs
|TKO
|2
|26/04/2014
|align=left| Žilina, Slovakia
|align=left|
|-
|Loss
|
|align=left| Laszlo Hubert
|PTS
|8
|27/01/2013
|align=left| Budapest, Hungary
|align=left|
|-
|Loss
|
|align=left| Gabor Halasz
|TKO
|7
|23/03/2013
|align=left| Szekszárd, Hungary
|align=left|
|-
|Loss
|
|align=left| Agron Smakici
|TKO
|1
|27/01/2013
|align=left| Vienna, Austria
|align=left|
|-
|Win
|
|align=left| Istvan Varga
|UD
|4
|01/03/2012
|align=left| Budapest, Hungary
|align=left|
|-
|Loss
|
|align=left| Gabor Halasz
|UD
|4
|01/03/2012
|align=left| Budapest, Hungary
|align=left|
|-
|Win
|
|align=left| Adnan Buharalija
|RTD
|3
|20/11/2011
|align=left| Capljina, Bosnia and Herzegovina
|align=left|
|-
|Win
|
|align=left| Imre Kosa
|TKO
|3
|09/07/2011
|align=left| Győr, Hungary
|align=left|
|-
|Loss
|
|align=left| Roman Kracik
|TKO
|2
|30/12/2010
|align=left| Prague, Czech Republic
|align=left|
|-
|Win
|
|align=left| Gabor Kovacs
|TKO
|3
|12/10/2010
|align=left| Nové Zámky, Slovakia
|align=left|
|-
|Loss
|
|align=left| Laszlo Hubert
|DQ
|6
|02/05/2010
|align=left| Tirana, Albania
|align=left|
|-
|Win
|
|align=left| Miklos Toldi
|TKO
|1
|27/10/2009
|align=left| Sturovo, Slovakia
|align=left|
|-
|Loss
|
|align=left| Ali Ismailov
|TKO
|2
|25/09/2009
|align=left| Saint Petersburg, Russia
|align=left|
|-
|Draw
|
|align=left| Viktor Szalai
|PTS
|4
|19/08/2009
|align=left| Sturovo, Slovakia
|align=left|
|-
|Win
|
|align=left| Zoltan Peto
|PTS
|6
|12/05/2009
|align=left| Nové Zámky, Slovakia
|align=left|
|-
|Loss
|
|align=left| Geoffrey Battelo
|TKO
|5
|04/04/2009
|align=left| Düsseldorf, Germany
|align=left|
|-
|Loss
|
|align=left| Tomasz Hutkowski
|TKO
|3
|13/12/2008
|align=left| Ketrzyn, Poland
|align=left|
|-
|Win
|
|align=left| Janos Somogyi
|PTS
|4
|25/06/2008
|align=left| Sturovo, Slovakia
|align=left|
|-
|Loss
|
|align=left| Gregory Soszynski
|TKO
|4
|01/06/2008
|align=left| Józefów, Poland
|align=left|
|-
|Win
|
|align=left| Janos Somogyi
|PTS
|4
|01/05/2008
|align=left| Sturovo, Slovakia
|align=left|
|-
|Loss
|
|align=left| Lasse Johansen
|TKO
|4
|23/03/2008
|align=left| Esbjerg, Denmark
|align=left|
|-
|Win
|
|align=left| Miklos Toldi
|TKO
|2
|25/01/2008
|align=left| Budapest, Hungary
|align=left|
|-
|Loss
|
|align=left| Ramdane Serdjane
|DQ
|6
|25/12/2007
|align=left| Izegem, Belgium
|align=left|
|-
|Win
|
|align=left| Miklos Toldi
|TKO
|2
|14/04/2007
|align=left| Košice, Slovakia
|align=left|
|-
|Win
|
|align=left| Szabolcs Gergely
|TKO
|2
|26/03/2007
|align=left| Budapest, Hungary
|align=left|
|-
|Loss
|
|align=left| Sebastian Koeber
|KO
|2
|16/02/2007
|align=left| Cologne, Germany
|align=left|
|-
|Win
|
|align=left| Szabolcs Gergely
|PTS
|6
|13/01/2007
|align=left| Nové Zámky, Slovakia
|align=left|
|-
|Loss
|
|align=left| Mariusz Wach
|TKO
|4
|16/12/2006
|align=left| Poznań, Poland
|align=left|
|-
|Loss
|
|align=left| Geoffrey Battelo
|UD
|6
|18/11/2006
|align=left| Namur, Belgium
|align=left|
|-
|Loss
|
|align=left| Edgars Kalnars
|UD
|8
|28/10/2006
|align=left| Fuerstenwalde, Germany
|align=left|
|-
|Win
|
|align=left| Csaba Bajczik
|PTS
|4
|12/10/2006
|align=left| Budapest, Hungary
|align=left|
|-
|Loss
|
|align=left| Goran Gogic
|KO
|2
|09/09/2006
|align=left| Hamburg, Germany
|align=left|
|-
|Loss
|
|align=left| Aleksandr Alekseyev
|TKO
|4
|25/07/2006
|align=left| Hamburg, Germany
|align=left|
|-
|Win
|
|align=left| Csaba Bajczik
|PTS
|6
|09/06/2006
|align=left| Nové Zámky, Slovakia
|align=left|
|-
|Loss
|
|align=left| Jean Claude Bikoi
|TKO
|6
|05/05/2006
|align=left| Dudelange, Luxembourg
|align=left|
|-
|Loss
|
|align=left| Jean Marc Monrose
|DQ
|4
|15/04/2006
|align=left| Uzès, France
|align=left|
|-
|Win
|
|align=left| Csaba Olah
|PTS
|4
|17/03/2006
|align=left| Tokol, Hungary
|align=left|
|-
|Loss
|
|align=left| Pietro Aurino
|PTS
|6
|10/03/2006
|align=left| Bergamo, Italy
|align=left|
|-
|Win
|
|align=left| Stefan Kusnier
|PTS
|4
|07/02/2006
|align=left| Nové Zámky, Slovakia
|align=left|
|-
|Win
|
|align=left| Miklos Toldi
|PTS
|4
|23/01/2006
|align=left| Budapest, Hungary
|align=left|
|-
|Loss
|
|align=left| Giacobbe Fragomeni
|TKO
|4
|16/12/2005
|align=left| Milan, Italy
|align=left|
|-
|Win
|
|align=left| Zsolt Nemet
|PTS
|4
|30/11/2005
|align=left| Sturovo, Slovakia
|align=left|
|-
|Loss
|
|align=left| Mark Hendem
|UD
|6
|26/11/2005
|align=left| Leverkusen, Germany
|align=left|
|-
|Win
|
|align=left| Gabor Czinke
|PTS
|4
|24/10/2005
|align=left| Sturovo, Slovakia
|align=left|
|-
|Loss
|
|align=left| Johny Jensen
|TKO
|5
|30/09/2005
|align=left| Slagelse, Denmark
|align=left|
|-
|Win
|
|align=left| Zsolt Nemet
|TKO
|3
|03/09/2005
|align=left| Budapest, Hungary
|align=left|
|-
|Win
|
|align=left| Sylvester Petrovic
|TKO
|2
|19/08/2005
|align=left| Sturovo, Slovakia
|align=left|
|-
|Win
|
|align=left| Miklos Toldi
|PTS
|4
|12/08/2005
|align=left| Sturovo, Slovakia
|align=left|
|-
|Win
|
|align=left| Gabor Czinke
|PTS
|4
|07/08/2005
|align=left| Sturovo, Slovakia
|align=left|
|-
|Win
|
|align=left| Norbert Turanyi
|PTS
|4
|01/08/2005
|align=left| Sturovo, Slovakia
|align=left|
|-
|Win
|
|align=left| Sylvester Petrovic
|PTS
|6
|24/07/2005
|align=left| Nové Zámky, Slovakia
|align=left|
|-
|Win
|
|align=left| Miklos Toldi
|PTS
|4
|17/07/2005
|align=left| Nové Zámky, Slovakia
|align=left|
|-
|Win
|
|align=left| Gabor Czinke
|PTS
|4
|10/07/2005
|align=left| Budapest, Hungary
|align=left|
|-
|Draw
|
|align=left| Laszlo Paszterko
|PTS
|4
|13/06/2005
|align=left| Sturovo, Slovakia
|align=left|
|-
|Loss
|
|align=left| Silvio Branco
|TKO
|4
|20/05/2005
|align=left| Roma, Italy
|align=left|
|-
|Win
|
|align=left| Vlado Szabo
|PTS
|4
|27/04/2005
|align=left| Košice, Slovakia
|align=left|
|-
|Loss
|
|align=left| Mohamed Benguesmia
|TKO
|3
|09/03/2005
|align=left| Algiers, Algeria
|align=left|
|-
|Win
|
|align=left| Vlado Szabo
|PTS
|4
|04/01/2005
|align=left| Sturovo, Slovakia
|align=left|
|-
|Win
|
|align=left| Csaba Olah
|UD
|4
|28/12/2004
|align=left| Nyíregyháza, Hungary
|align=left|
|-
|Win
|
|align=left| Stefan Kusnier
|KO
|1
|11/12/2004
|align=left| Salzburg, Austria
|align=left|
|-
|Loss
|
|align=left| Paolo Ferrara
|PTS
|6
|12/11/2004
|align=left| Collegno, Italy
|align=left|
|-
|Loss
|
|align=left| Alessandro Guni
|PTS
|6
|16/10/2004
|align=left| Verbania, Italy
|align=left|
|-
|Loss
|
|align=left| Lasse Johansen
|TKO
|3
|17/04/2004
|align=left| Mariehamn, Finland
|align=left|
|-
|Loss
|
|align=left| Remo Tatangelo
|PTS
|6
|26/12/2003
|align=left| Grosseto, Italy
|align=left|
|-
|Loss
|
|align=left| Silvio Branco
|TKO
|5
|31/05/2003
|align=left| Civitavecchia, Italy
|align=left|
|-
|Loss
|
|align=left| Kamel Amrane
|UD
|8
|19/05/2003
|align=left| Levallois-Perret, France
|align=left|
|-
|Loss
|
|align=left| Tomasz Adamek
|UD
|6
|06/04/2003
|align=left| Benidorm, Spain
|align=left|
|-
|Loss
|
|align=left| Allan Gronfors
|UD
|6
|25/02/2003
|align=left| Helsinki, Finland
|align=left|
|-
|Loss
|
|align=left| Milan Konecny
|TKO
|3
|17/05/2002
|align=left| Prague, Czech Republic
|align=left|
|-
|Loss
|
|align=left| Lee Manuel Ossie
|KO
|8
|13/04/2002
|align=left| Berlin, Germany
|align=left|
|-
|Win
|
|align=left| Lubomir Janota
|TKO
|4
|23/02/2002
|align=left| Nové Zámky, Slovakia
|align=left|
|-
|Loss
|
|align=left| Jackson Chanet
|TKO
|4
|22/12/2001
|align=left| Orléans, France
|align=left|
|-
|Loss
|
|align=left| Vincenzo Cantatore
|TKO
|3
|17/11/2001
|align=left| Civitavecchia, Italy
|align=left|
|-
|Loss
|
|align=left| Milan Konecny
|PTS
|8
|13/10/2001
|align=left| Budapest, Hungary
|align=left|
|-
|Loss
|
|align=left| Stipe Drews
|PTS
|6
|23/09/2001
|align=left| Eddersheim, Hessen, Germany
|align=left|
|-
|Win
|
|align=left| Marek Svoren
|TKO
|3
|19/08/2001
|align=left| Sturovo, Slovakia
|align=left|
|-
|Loss
|
|align=left| Mario Tonus
|PTS
|10
|20/07/2001
|align=left| San Dona di Piave, Italy
|align=left|
|-
|Loss
|
|align=left| Frederic Serrat
|PTS
|6
|03/07/2001
|align=left| Pont-Sainte-Maxence, France
|align=left|
|-
|Win
|
|align=left| Ahmet Oener
|PTS
|6
|05/05/2001
|align=left| Braunschweig, Germany
|align=left|
|-
|Win
|
|align=left| Velimir Listes
|TKO
|2
|17/03/2001
|align=left| Budapest, Hungary
|align=left|
|-
|Loss
|
|align=left| Julien Chamayou
|PTS
|6
|06/03/2001
|align=left| Clermont-Ferrand, France
|align=left|
|-
|Loss
|
|align=left| Yohan Gimenez
|PTS
|6
|13/02/2001
|align=left| Pont-Audemer, France
|align=left|
|-
|Loss
|
|align=left| Simon Bakinde
|PTS
|6
|19/12/2000
|align=left| Pont-Sainte-Maxence, France
|align=left|
|-
|Win
|
|align=left| Stefan Cirok
|PTS
|4
|23/06/2000
|align=left| Budapest, Hungary
|align=left|
|-
|Draw
|
|align=left| Alessandro Guni
|PTS
|6
|03/06/2000
|align=left| Vienna, Austria
|align=left|
|-
|Loss
|
|align=left| Firat Arslan
|PTS
|8
|21/08/1999
|align=left| Dresden, Germany
|align=left|
|-
|Loss
|
|align=left| Jesper Kristiansen
|TKO
|5
|13/08/1999
|align=left| Skagen, Denmark
|align=left|
|-
|Win
|
|align=left| Yves Monsieur
|PTS
|6
|19/06/1999
|align=left| Vienna, Austria
|align=left|
|-
|Win
|
|align=left| Oleg Vdovenko
|KO
|1
|07/05/1999
|align=left| Vienna, Austria
|align=left|
|-
|Win
|
|align=left| Ferenc Deak
|PTS
|10
|18/04/1999
|align=left| Tokol, Hungary
|align=left|
|-
|Loss
|
|align=left| Dirk Wallyn
|TKO
|7
|05/12/1998
|align=left| Ingelmunster, Belgium
|align=left|
|-
|Loss
|
|align=left| Jerry Benech
|PTS
|6
|22/09/1998
|align=left| Pont-Audemer, France
|align=left|
|-
|Win
|
|align=left| Sylvester Petrovic
|PTS
|6
|30/08/1998
|align=left| Budapest, Hungary
|align=left|
|-
|Win
|
|align=left| Peter Simko
|TKO
|3
|15/05/1998
|align=left| Szekszárd, Hungary
|align=left|
|-
|Win
|
|align=left| Mohammed Lassoued
|KO
|2
|28/02/1998
|align=left| Zofingen, Switzerland
|align=left|
|-
|Win
|
|align=left| Richard Less
|KO
|1
|21/02/1998
|align=left| Budapest, Hungary
|align=left|
|-
|Win
|
|align=left| Laszlo Virag
|PTS
|4
|17/01/1998
|align=left| Budapest, Hungary
|align=left|
|}

References

External links
 

1968 births
Living people
People from Nyírbátor
Light-heavyweight boxers
Boxers at the 1992 Summer Olympics
Olympic boxers of Hungary
Olympic bronze medalists for Hungary
Olympic medalists in boxing
Hungarian male boxers
Medalists at the 1992 Summer Olympics
Sportspeople from Szabolcs-Szatmár-Bereg County